Angélica Lagunas (born 26 May 1972) was a provincial deputy in Neuquén Province in Argentina.

She is a member of Socialist Left (Argentina) and was elected as a candidate of the Workers' Left Front.

She held the post in rotation for a year, taking over from Raúl Godoy in December 2013, and handing over to Gabriela Suppicich in December 2014.

She previously worked as a school teacher.

External links 
article
video of her making her first speech in the provincial assembly

Living people
Socialist Left (Argentina) politicians
People from Neuquén Province
1972 births
Argentine schoolteachers
21st-century Argentine educators
Argentine women educators
21st-century Argentine politicians
21st-century Argentine women politicians
21st-century women educators